Hexamili may refer to the following places : 

 the modern site of Chersonesus in Europa, an ancient city in Turkish Thrace
 Examilia, a town in the municipality of Corinth, Greece